The 1974–75 National Hurling League was the 44th season of the National Hurling League.

Division 1

Cork came into the season as defending champions of the 1973-74 season.

On 25 May 1975, Galway won the title following a 4-9 to 4-6 win over Tipperary in the final. It was their 3rd league title overall and their first since 1950-51.

Wicklow were relegated to Division 2 after losing all of their group stage matches in Division 1B.

Tipperary's Francis Loughnane was the Division 1 top scorer with 5-35.

Division 1A table

Group stage

Division 1B table

Group stage

Knock-out stage

Quarter-finals

Semi-finals

Final

Scoring statistics

Top scorers overall

Top scorers in a single game

Division 2

Division 2 table

External links

References

National Hurling League seasons
League
League